Curtis Ladonn Adams (born April 30, 1962) is a former American football player.  He played running back at Central Michigan University and with the San Diego Chargers of the NFL.

Early life
Adams was born on April 30, 1962 in Muskegon, Michigan.  He attended Orchard View High School.

College career
In 1982, Adams was a second-team All-American selection by the UPI and was named Mid-American Conference "Offensive Player of the Year".  He was first in team all-MAC selection three straight years. Curtis gained 1,090, 1,431, and 1,204 yards in his final three seasons at Central Michigan.  At Central Michigan, Adams set multiple school records:

most net yards gained rushing in a single game (238)
most rushing touchdowns in a single game
longest run from scrimmage (87)
career rushing yards (4,126) (third most in MAC history)
most career touchdowns (44) (also set a MAC record)

Professional career
Drafted in the eighth round of the 1985 NFL Draft by the San Diego Chargers, Curtis played four seasons in the NFL totaling 907 yards and seven touchdowns rushing and 76 yards on nine receptions.  His best game in the NFL came on a nationally televised Thursday night game on November 20, 1986 against the Los Angeles Raiders.  Although the Chargers lost, Curtis rushed 26 times for 93 yards and three touchdowns.

References

1962 births
Living people
American football running backs
Central Michigan Chippewas football players
San Diego Chargers players
Sportspeople from Muskegon, Michigan
Players of American football from Michigan